Trigonopterus batukarensis is a species of flightless weevil in the genus Trigonopterus from Indonesia.

Etymology
The specific name is derived from that of the type locality.

Description
Individuals measure 2.48–2.78 mm in length.  General coloration is black with rust-colored legs and antennae.

Range

Phylogeny
T. batukarensis is part of the T. saltator species group.

References

batukarensis
Beetles described in 2014
Beetles of Asia